Gennaro Papa (23 March 1925 – 31 December 2018) was an Italian politician who served as a Deputy from 1961 to 1963 and from 1968 to 1976.

References

1925 births
2018 deaths
Italian politicians